George Hahn is the name of:

 George Philip Hahn (1879–1937), American judge
 George Hahn (politician) (1911–1963), Canadian Member of Parliament
 George W. Hahn (1894–1977), American orthodontist